Joseph Christian Freiherr von Zedlitz (Baron Joseph Christian von Zedlitz; February 28, 1790 in Jánský Vrch Castle, Javorník (today in the Czech Republic) – March 16, 1862 in Vienna, Austria) was an Austrian dramatist and epic poet.

His wife died 1836, and 1837 he was nominated by the foreign service to work for the Foreign Office. He was sent as representative of the Austrian imperial court to the principalities of Sachsen-Weimar-Eisenach, Nassau, Braunschweig, Oldenburg and Reuss.

He was also a good friend of Joseph Freiherr von Eichendorff.

Works 
 Todtenkränze, 1828
 Gedichte, 1832, 1859
 Soldaten-Büchlein, 2 Bände, 1849/50. – Kerker und Krone, 1834 (Drama)
 Über die orientalische Frage, 1840 (politische Flugschrift)
 Übersetzungen (Lord Byron). – Ausgabe: Dramatische Werke, 4 Bände, 1830–36

References 
 C. D. Freiherr von Zedlitz-Neukirch, J. C. von Zedlitz, in: Aurora 29, 1969.

Notes

External links
 

1790 births
1862 deaths
People from Javorník
People from Austrian Silesia
19th-century Austrian poets
Austrian male poets
Joseph Christian
Bohemian nobility
Barons of Austria
19th-century Austrian dramatists and playwrights
Austrian male dramatists and playwrights
Knights of the Order of Saint Stephen of Hungary
19th-century Austrian male writers